Acipa (Achipa) may be either of two languages which are related, though not more closely than they are to each other: 

Western Acipa language
Eastern Acipa language